Eustra shanghaiensis, is a species of flanged bombardier beetle belonging to the family Carabidae. It is endemic to China.

Description
Body length is 3.06–3.17 mm. Body yellowish-brown in color. Head and pronotum with reddish tinge. There is a dark spot on each elytron. Head convex and gently covered with yellow setae. Eyes small. Antennae submoniliform. Pronotum sparsely covered with yellow setae. Elytra densely punctulate and pubescent. Hind wings well developed. Male has wide sternite, which is widely truncate.

References

Beetles described in 2018
Paussinae